Bullpound Creek is a stream in Alberta, Canada.

Bullpound Creek's name comes from the Blackfoot Indians of the area, due to a buffalo pound near its course.

See also
List of rivers of Alberta

References

Rivers of Alberta